Wild Card is a 2015 American action thriller film directed by Simon West and starring Jason Statham, Michael Angarano, Milo Ventimiglia, Dominik Garcia-Lorido, Anne Heche, and Sofia Vergara.  Based on the 1985 novel Heat by William Goldman, it is a remake of the 1986 adaptation that starred Burt Reynolds. The film was released in the United States on January 30, 2015 in a limited release and through video on demand.

Wild Card received negative reviews and was a box-office bomb, making only $6.7 million worldwide against a $30 million budget.

Plot
Nick Wild is a recovering gambling addict who takes odd jobs in Las Vegas as a "chaperone" (his version of a bodyguard) to support his addiction. After helping a client impress a girl, he accepts a proposition from a young man, Cyrus Kinnick, to show him around Vegas and provide protection while he gambles.

While eating at a diner, Nick's waitress friend Roxy hands him a message from a woman he knows, Holly, who wants him to stop by her house. Holly, a professional escort, explains she had a date the previous night at the Golden Nugget. Afterward, she was brutally raped and beaten by three unknown folks in their hotel room. Holly asks Nick to find out who they are so that she can sue them.

Nick discovers that the one  who is responsible for raping Holly is Danny DeMarco, a gangster, who had two of his thugs dump her in a hospital car park. Nick goes to the hotel to confront DeMarco and a confrontation develops, resulting in Nick overpowering DeMarco and his men, who are tied up. Nick calls Holly, who contemplates castrating DeMarco, who then breaks down and begs her forgiveness. Holly decides to just take the $50,000 from DeMarco's desk and leaves.

Holly splits the money with Nick and leaves Las Vegas. Nick takes Cyrus to a casino and whilst playing blackjack with dealer friend Cassandra, Nick goes on a huge winning streak with the next dealer, amassing over a half a million dollars. But when he goes to the cashier, he has a sudden anxiety attack and decides to keep on gambling, eventually losing all his winnings (as well as his original $25,000) on a single blackjack bet with Cassandra. The next morning, Cyrus, revealed to be a self-made millionaire, wants Nick to mentor him on being brave, but Nick declines. At the bar, DeMarco's boys arrive to deliver Nick to DeMarco, but Nick fends them off.

Nick meets with Baby, the mafia boss of Las Vegas. Baby has received a complaint from DeMarco, who claims that Nick broke into his hotel room, pistol-whipped him, and killed two of his men – all to fund his gambling addiction. Baby takes Nick to a room with DeMarco, where Nick tells his side of the story: that DeMarco killed his own guys, to save face after begging for his life, and that DeMarco bears a cut on his sex. Baby tells DeMarco to drop his pants to prove Nick wrong, but he refuses and leaves.

At the local diner, Cyrus offers Nick a check for $500,000 and a plane ticket to Corsica for what he has learned from Nick. DeMarco and his crew appear in the diner. Cyrus shows his newfound manliness by singing loudly as a distraction so Nick can escape. Nick thinks about his sailboat and then kills the thugs and DeMarco with his utensils behind the diner.

Afterwards, Cyrus insists Nick take the check and the ticket, and Nick accepts. Nick then drives out of Las Vegas.

Cast

 Jason Statham as Nick Wild
 Michael Angarano as Cyrus Kinnick
 Milo Ventimiglia as Danny DeMarco
 Dominik Garcia-Lorido as Holly
 Anne Heche as Roxy
 Sofía Vergara as DD
 Max Casella as Osgood
 Jason Alexander as Pinky

 Francois Vincentelli as Benny
 Daviena McFadden as Millicent

 Chris Browning as Tiel
 Matthew Willig as Kinlaw
 Grieice Santo as Cocktail Waitress

 Hope Davis as Cassandra

 Stanley Tucci as Baby
 Michael Papajohn as Pit Boss
 Lara Grice as First Doctor

Production
Simon West said that Jason Statham developed the project himself "maybe over five years". At one point, Brian De Palma was slated to direct until West replaced him. West stated:

West said the script filmed was the one Goldman wrote over thirty years ago. He later elaborated:

I rang him up and said, "I'm about to put the record straight and fix this film for you." I did ask him, what's your one piece of advice for me when shooting this? He said, "Just make sure that Nick is the toughest guy you've ever seen in your life." That, I think is his approach – no matter how complicated the character is intellectually, no matter how much dialogue there is, or twists and turns Goldman puts in the script, at the end of the day, he has this one thing that he has above his desk that reminds him what the character should be. It was the same for me – once he told me that, "Nick's the toughest guy in Vegas", every scene informs that. Even when he's not doing anything, everybody in the room knows that, and everybody knows his history, what he's capable of. And so he ultimately doesn't have to do that much, because he is the toughest guy in Vegas.

"It was nice firstly to have a script that was so set, because on any big movie scripts are constantly in flux," said West. "It also made it easy to sell to actors like Stanley Tucci and Sofia Vergara because their parts were very set out. There's nothing in the script that's really aged, there's no pyrotechnics or technology really."

Filming
Filming began in early 2013 in New Orleans, Louisiana. The principal photography began in February 2013.

Simon West said the three fights were "character driven".

each one of the action moments is character-driven, so you're right, it builds up. So when it does explode, it's exploding for the right reason. The first one, he's getting back into his old skills – precision fighting. The only way he's going to get out alive is by relying on his old skills. And he's a master of that. The second fight explodes out of anger, and it's really anger at himself for going back to being a gambling addict. They're character-driven fights. Whereas traditionally in action films, they're light relief – they're almost commercial breaks in the story. These ones come out of the situation his character's in, not just that he's in jeopardy and has to fight his way out of it – they're emotional fights.

Marketing
The trailer for Wild Card debuted on December 12, 2014. West later recalled:

Release
Lionsgate released the film in a limited release and through on demand on January 30, 2015.

Reception

Box office
Wild Card was a box office bomb, making only $6.7 million against a $30 million budget.

Critical response
Wild Card has generally received negative reviews from film critics. On Rotten Tomatoes the film has an approval rating of 32% based on reviews from 56 critics, with an average rating of 4.85 out of 10. The site's consensus states: "Hardcore Jason Statham fans may enjoy parts of Wild Card, but all other action aficionados need not apply." On Metacritic the film has a score of 40 out of 100 based on reviews from 19 critics.

Betsy Sharkey of the Los Angeles Times gave the film a negative review, calling Wild Card "predictable". She summed up her review by saying that Wild Card "is no royal flush, no full house, no three of a kind. A bust is I think the term I'm searching for".

See also
 List of films set in Las Vegas

References

External links

 
 
 

2015 films
2015 action thriller films
Remakes of American films
American action thriller films
American rape and revenge films
Films scored by Dario Marianelli
Films based on adaptations
Films based on American crime novels
Films based on works by William Goldman
Films directed by Simon West
Films set in the Las Vegas Valley
Films shot in Corsica
Films shot in the Las Vegas Valley
Films shot in New Orleans
Films with screenplays by William Goldman
Films about gambling
Lionsgate films
Cultural depictions of the Mafia
Works about the American Mafia
Italian-American culture
Films about the American Mafia
2010s English-language films
2010s American films